Rosa 'Love and Peace',  (aka BALpeace), is a hybrid tea rose cultivar bred in the United States by Ping Lim and Jerry Twomey in 1991. The rose was named an All-America Rose Selections winner in 2002.

Description
'Love and Peace' is a medium-tall upright shrub, 4 to 6 ft (121—182 cm) in height with a 2 to 3 ft (60—90 cm) spread. Blooms are large,  6 in (15 cm) in diameter, with a high-centered bloom form. Flowers are lemon yellow with dark pink edges, and are typically borne singly, and more rarely in small clusters.
The rose has a medium, fruity fragrance and large, dark green foliage. 'Love and Peace' is an outstanding exhibition rose as well as a good garden rose. It blooms in flushes from spring through fall. The plants does well in USDA zone 7 and warmer. 

'Love and Peace' was used by Alain Meilland, in France, to hybridize, the hybrid tea Rosa, 'Mademoiselle Meilland', (2006). The cultivar's stock parents are: ('Christopher Columbus x 'Graham Thomas') x 'Love and Peace'.

Awards 
 All-America Rose Selections (AARS) winner, USA, (2002)

See also
Garden roses
Rose Hall of Fame
List of Award of Garden Merit roses

Notes

References

Love and Peace